Demigod is the seventh studio album by Polish extreme metal band Behemoth. The album was recorded during May and July in 2004 at the Hendrix Studios and was released in October 2004. Daniel Bergstrand mixed the record at the Dug out Studios in Uppsala, Sweden during July and August in 2004. The record was then mastered at the Cutting Room in Stockholm, Sweden in August 2004.

The track "XUL" included a guest guitar solo by Karl Sanders of Nile.

The track "Before the Æons Came" is an adaptation of a poem by British poet Algernon Charles Swinburne.

The track "Conquer All" was featured as DLC in the rhythm game Rock Band 2, and has continued to be featured in subsequent games.

Along with being Behemoth's breakthrough album, Demigod is now considered a landmark album within the Polish death metal scene, with Decibel Magazine notably including it in their Hall of Fame.

Track listing

Personnel

 Behemoth
 Adam "Nergal" Darski – vocals, guitars, acoustic guitar, lyrics
 Zbigniew Robert "Inferno" Promiński – drums and percussion
 Tomasz "Orion" Wróblewski – bass guitar

 Additional musicians
 Patryk Dominik "Seth" Sztyber – session guitars 
 Karl Sanders – guitar solo on "XUL"
 Piotr Bańka – synthesizer, and arrangements
 Academic Male Choir From Lublin – choir

 Production
 Arkadiusz "Malta" Malczewski – sound engineer
 Tomasz "Graal" Daniłowicz – cover design and artwork
 Krzysztof Azarewicz – lyrics
 Zenon Darski – weaponry and armour
 Thomas Eberger – mastering
 Sharon E. Wennekers – grammatical consultations
 Dominik Kulaszewicz – photography
 Krzysztof Sadowski – photography
 Tomasz Daniłowicz – The Core Ov Hell mask design
 Zenon Darski – The Core Ov Hell mask finishing
 Norbert Grabianowski – The Core Ov Hell mask forging

 Note
Recorded at Hendrix Studios, Lublin; May–July 2004 
Mixed at Dug Out Studio, Upsala; July–August 2004 
Mastered at Cutting Room, Stockholm; August 2004

Release history

Charts

References

2004 albums
Behemoth (band) albums
Century Media Records albums
Regain Records albums
Albums produced by Adam Darski